The list of kindergartens in Hong Kong includes all the kindergartens and nursery schools registered at the Education Bureau, and is arranged by the 18 districts of Hong Kong. The districts sequence is according to the "Profile of Kindergartens and Kindergarten-cum-Child Care Centres" of Hong Kong Education Bureau.
Up to September 2007, there are 1,001 kindergartens and nursery schools registered at Education Bureau in Hong Kong.

Kindergartens and nursery school lists in Hong Kong

Kowloon

New territories 
Total schools: 90
Eligible for Redemption of Voucher in the 2007/08 School Year
Baptist Oasis English Kindergarten
Alliance Kindergarten
Bethel Kindergarten
Cannan International Kindergarten
Cannan Kindergarten (Kowloon Tong)
Cannan Kindergarten (Waterloo Road)
Catiline Kindergarten (Whampoa)
Christian Youth Centre Kindergarten
Creative Kindergarten
Deborah A/C Kindergarten (Whampoa Garden)
First Assembly of God Prim Sch & Kg
Heep Yunn School Private Kindergarten
HKSPC Ma Tau Chung Nursery School
HKSPC SIA Whampoa Nursery School
Ho Oi Day Nursery (Sik Sik Yuen)
Holy Trinity Centre Kindergarten
Homantin Baptist Church Kindergarten
Homantin Yang Memorial Methodist Pre-Sch
Hong Kong Soka Kindergarten
Hunghom Rhenish Church Kindergarten
Kowloon Cannan A/C Kindergarten
Kowloon City Baptist Church Kg
Kowloon Ling Liang Church Day Nursery
Kowloon Ling Liang Church Kg
Kowloon Women's Welfare Club Nursery Sch
Lutheran Philip House Ma Tau Wai Nur Sch
Martha Boss Lutheran Day Nursery
May Nga Kindergarten
May Nga Kindergarten Branch
May Nga Nursery
Munsang College
Oi Man Cannan A/C Kindergarten
PLK Li Tsui Chung Sing Memorial Kg
PLK Tam Au-Yeung Siu Fong Memorial Kg
PLK Ting Mau Hung Hom Kindergarten
Po LeunKuk Kowloon City Kindergarten
Po Leung Kuk Sheung Lok Kindergarten
Pok Oi Hospital Mrs Yam Wing Yin Kg
Pooi To Primary School
Pui Ching Primary School
SA Lok Man Nursery Sch
SKH Good Shepherd Church Kindergarten
SKH HTC Tsang Shiu Tim Kindergarten
St Mark's Church Bradbury Kindergarten
St Monica's Kindergarten
St Rose of Lima's Kindergarten
St. Teresa's School Kowloon
Stafford English Kindergarten (Local Stream)
Sun Island English Kindergarten
Sun Island Kindergarten (Ma Tau Wai Br)
Tsung Tsin Mission of HK On Kei Nur Sch
TWGHs Lo Wong Pik Shan Nursery Sch
Safari Kid's Pre-school
William International Kindergarten (Local Stream)
YMCA of Hong Kong Farm Road Nursery Sch
York English & Chinese Kindergarten
York English Primary Sch & Kg (Kln Tong)
Non Joining the Pre-primary Education Voucher Scheme in the 2007/08 School Year
American Int'l School (Pre-Primer)
Anfield International Kindergarten
Australian International School HK
Christ Church Kindergarten
Christian Alliance P C Lau Mem Intl Sch
Creative Primary School's Kindergarten
Deborah International Pre-School
Deborah Int'l Pre-School (Site 7)
Delia Sch of Canada (Kln)-HHKA (Kg Sect)
Dibber Kindergarten (Whampoa) 
Funful Kindergarten
Good Health Kindergarten (Laguna Verde)
HK Baptist University-Kindergarten
Hong Kong Preschool (Kowloon Tong)
Keen Mind Kindergarten
Kentville Kindergarten
Kingston International Kindergarten 
Kowloon Baptist Church Kindergarten
Kowloon Funful Kindergarten
Learning Habitat Kg (Laguna Verde)
St Catherine's International Kg (Norfolk Road)
St Catherine's International Kg (Essex Crescent)
St Johannes College (Waterloo Road)
St Johannes College (Flint Road)
St Nicholas' Eng Prim Sch & Kindergarten
Stafford English Kindergarten (International Stream)
Think International School
Tutor Time Int'l Kg (Kowloon Tong)
Victoria Homantin International Nursery
William International Kindergarten (International Stream)
Yew Chung Children's Hse (Somerset Road)
Yew Chung International School (Kg Sect)
Yew Chung Int’l Children Hse (Waterloo)
Yew Chung Int’l Children's Hse (Kent Rd)

Kwun Tong District
Total schools: 74
Eligible for Redemption of Voucher in the 2007/08 School Year
Amoy Plaza St Teresa Kindergarten
BGCA HK Cheerland Kg (Kowloon Bay)
Buddhist Chi Wai Day Nursery
Buddhist Kam Lai Kindergarten
Ca Sau Mau Ping Chen Lee Wing Tsing Kg
Cannan International Kindergarten
Caritas Nursery School - Lei Yue Mun
Caritas Nursery School - Yau Tong
CCC Kei Faat Kindergarten
CCC Kei Wa Kindergarten
CFSC Cheerland Kg
Chan Mung Yan Lutheran Kindergarten
Choi Ha Estate Kit Sam Kindergarten
Christian Family Service Ctr Tak Tin Kg
Christian Little Angel Kg Richland Gdn
CNEC Christian Kindergarten
Creative Day Nursery (Sceneway)
Creative Kindergarten (Sceneway Garden)
Diamond Hill Bap Ch Bright Blossoms Kg
ELCHK Ling On Nursery School
Fei Ngan Kindergarten
Garden Estate Baptist Nursery School
HK & Macau Lutheran Church Tsui En Kg
HKCS Kwun Tong Nursery School
HKSPC Mr & Mrs Thomas Tam Nursery School
Hong Kong Student Aid Society Po Tat Nur
Hong Ying A/C Kindergarten
Jing Jing Kindergarten (Shun Lee Branch)
Kei Kwong Kindergarten
Kwun Tong Baptist Church Kindergarten
Kwun Tong Lutheran School & Kg
Kwun Tong Methodist Kindergarten
Kwun Tong St Agnes English Kindergarten
Lam Tin Ling Liang Kindergarten
Lei Yue Mun Methodist Kindergarten
Lok Sin Tong Kindergarten
Lok Sin Tong Man Ng Wing Yee Kg
Lok Wah Kindergarten
Lutheran Philip Hse Kai Yip Nursery Sch
New Kln Women Asso Lok Wah Nursery
Ngau Tau Kok Kingsland Kindergarten (II)
Peace Evangelical Ctr Kg (Ngau Tau Kok)
Pegasus Sau Wah Christian Kindergarten
Ping Shek Kingsland Kindergarten
Po Leung Kuk Kwun Tong Kindergarten
Po Leung Kuk Lee Siu Chan Kindergarten
Po Leung Kuk Mrs Fong Wong Kam Chuen Kg
Po Leung Kuk Ping Shek Kindergarten
Po Leung Kuk Tak Tin Kindergarten
Pok Oi Hospital Chan Hsu Fong Lam Kg
Pok Oi Hospital Sy Siok Chun Kg
Sharon Lutheran Church Kindergarten
Shin Yat Tong On Yat Kindergarten
Shun On Kindergarten
Shun Tin Rhenish Nursery
Sis. Immaculate Heart Mary Gospel SMP Kg
SKH KLC Holy Carpenter Kg
St Antonius Kindergarten
St Barnabas' Church Kindergarten
St James Catholic Kindergarten
St Philip Lutheran Church Kindergarten
St Vincent De Paul Nursery School
STFA Leung Kit Wah Kindergarten
Telford Gardens Kindergarten (Local Stream)
The Salvation Army Ping Tin Kindergarten
Tsung Tsin Mission of HK On Yee N Sch
TWGHs Chan Han Nursery School
TWGHs Wong See Sum Kindergarten
United Christian Med Service Nursery Sch
Yuen Yuen Kindergarten (Ping Tin Estate)
Non Joining the Pre-primary Education Voucher Scheme in the 2007/08 School Year
Oisca HK Japanese Kindergarten (Kowloon)
Mills International Preschool
Telford Gardens Kindergarten (Branch)
Telford Gardens Kindergarten (International Stream)
Think International Kindergarten

Sai Kung District
Total schools: 57
Eligible for Redemption of Voucher in the 2007/08 School Year
AEFCHK-EFCC-AGC Abundant Grace Nursery
AEFCHK-EFCC-Verbena Nursery Sch
Bapt Convention of HK RCHK Northwest Kg
Beverly A/C Kindergarten
BGCAHK Cheerland Kg (Tseung Kwan O)
Bilok Creative Kindergarten (1St Branch School)
Bilok Creative Kindergarten (Tseung Kwan O Br)
C&M Alli Church Un Tseung Kwan O Alli Kg
Caritas Nursery School - Tsui Lam
CCC HK Chi To Church Kei Pok Kg (TKO)
CMAC Verbena Kindergarten
Cumberland Presbyterian Church Po Lam Kg
Deborah English Kg (Bauhinia Garden)
Deborah English Kindergarten (TKO)
ELCHK Kin Ming Nursery School
ELCHK Tseung Kwan O Kindergarten
Fan Ho Wai Ching Memorial Kindergarten
Gar Lam Kindergarten
HKSKH St Simon's Sai Kung Nursery Sch
HKSPC Ocean Shores Nursery School
HKSPC Sze Wu Shu Min Nursery School
Ho Ching Kg (Sponsored by Sik Sik Yuen)
Junk Bay Kingsland Kindergarten
Garden House Preschool
King Lam Lutheran Day Nursery
Kwun Tong Baptist Church Choi Ming Kg
Lock Tao Christian Kindergarten
Maple Bear Canadian International Kindergarten - (TKO)
Mission Covenant Church Ss Annie's Kg
NTWJWA Leung Sing Tak A/C Kg (Ste)
Peace Lutheran Kindergarten
Pentecostal Ch of HK Tseung Kwan O Ns
PLK Fong Wong Woon Tai Kindergarten
PLK Yick Chark Fung Kindergarten
Po Leung Kuk Choi Ming Kindergarten
SA Ming Tak Nursery Sch
Sai Kung Lok-Yuk Kindergarten
St Andrew's Catholic Kindergarten
Stewards Pooi Yan Kindergarten
Sun Island English Kg (Sai Kung Branch)
The HKCC of Christ The Light Kg
The Salvation Army Hing Yan Kindergarten
TPMA Cheung Hok Ming Kindergarten (TKO)
Tseung Kwan O Methodist Kindergarten
Tsing Yi Trade Assn Tseung Kwan O Kg
Tsui Lam Estate Baptist Kindergarten
Tsung Tsin Mission Graceful Kindergarten
TWGHs Lions Club of Metropolitan HK Kg
TWGHs Nickon Kindergarten
Yan Oi Tong Dan Yang Wing Man Kg
Non Joining the Pre-primary Education Voucher Scheme in the 2007/08 School Year
Busy Bees Kindergarten
Deborah Int'l Pre-School (Bauhinia Garden)
Deborah Int'l Pre-School (Tseung Kwan O)
ESF Abacus International Kindergarten
Greenfield Eng (Intl) Kg and Nur (Tseung Kwan O)
Greenville Kids' World Kg (Metro City I)
Greenville Kids' World Kindergarten
New Song Christian Kindergarten
Sai Kung Pre-School Group

Sham Shui Po District
Total schools: 44
Eligible for Redemption of Voucher in the 2007/08 School Year
B.O.K.S.S. Pui Yan Pre-Primary Sc
Buddhist Tsang Kor Sing A/C Kg
CCC Kei Chun Kindergarten
Che Lok Kindergarten
Cheung Sha Wan K.W.A. Lam Tam Yin Wah Kg
Christian Alli Louey Choy Kwan Lok Kg
Creative Kindergarten (Yau Yat Chuen)
Delia English Pri Sch & Kg
ELCHK Nam Cheong Kindergarten
Faith Lutheran Church Kindergarten
Guideposts Kindergarten
Hip Woh Sch of The HK Council of CCC
HK Sheng Kung Hui Kei Oi Nursery School
HKCS Lei Cheng Uk Nursery School
HKCS Shek Kip Mei Nursery School
HKCS Tai Hang Tung Nursery School
HKSPC Cheung Sha Wan Nursery School
HKYMCA Chiu Oi Wah Nursery School
HKYMCA Shiu Pong Nursery School
Hong Kong YWCA Athena Kindergarten
James A/C Kindergarten (Sham Shui Po)
James Day Nursery (Sham Shui Po Branch)
Kln Gar Sum Anglo-Chinese Kindergarten
Kowloon Rhenish School
NMS Lutheran Kindergarten
Pentecostal Church of HK Nam Cheong Ns
PLK Lau Chan Siu Po Kindergarten
Po Leung Kuk Fung Pak Lim Kindergarten
Precious Blood Kg (Sham Shui Po)
SA Pak Tin Nursery Sch
Sham Shui Po Baptist Church Kindergarten
Sham Shui Po Tak Shin Kindergarten
Shum Oi Church Kindergarten
SKH Sham Shui Po Kei Oi Church Kg
St Thomas' Church Kindergarten
Suen Mei Kindergarten
Sun Island Kindergarten (Shamshuipo Br)
Tack Ching Kindergarten
Tak Nga Primary School
Tsung Tsin Mission of HK On Hong N Sch
Tsung Tsin Mission Pak Tin Graceful Kg
Tsung Tsin Primary School and Kg
Yan Oi Tong Pong Lo Shuk Yin Kg
Yau Yat Chuen School
Non Joining the Pre-primary Education Voucher Scheme in the 2007/08 School Year
Kendall International Preschool

Wong Tai Sin District
Total schools: 49
Eligible for Redemption of Voucher in the 2007/08 School Year
AOG Wa Wai Church Walker Hall A/C Kg
A-One Kindergarten
BGCAHK Cheerland Kg (Wong Tai Sin)
Buddhist Foo Hong Kindergarten
C & Ma Fu Shan Nursery Sch
Calvary Children's Centre Kindergarten
Caritas Kai Yau Nursery School
Chiu Ha Kindergarten
Christian Evangelical Centre Lok Fu Kg
Diamond Hill Ling Liang Kindergarten
ECFB Creativity Kindergarten
Five Dis B W Assn Cheung Chuk Shan Kg
Five Districts Business Welfare Assn Kg
Fu Shan Kindergarten
Good Time Kg (Choi Po Sin)
Grace Methodist Church Kg
Gracefield East Kowloon Christian Kg
HK & Macau Lutheran Church Shek On M Kg
HK Bethel Church Gideon Kindergarten
HKTA Yuen Yuen Kg (Tung Tau Estate)
HKYMCA Choi Wan Nursery School
HKYMCA Faith Hope Nursery School
Ho Lap Kg (Sponsored by Sik Sik Yuen)
Ho Tak Kg (Spon by Sik Sik Yuen)
Hong Kong Kg Association Pre-School
Kam Lam Catholic Kindergarten
Kowloon City Baptist Church Tsz Oi Kg
Lok Fu Rhenish Church Kg
Lok Fu Rhenish Nursery
Lok Sin Tong Ku Lee Kwok Sin Kg
Mei Tung Estate On Kee Kindergarten
New Kln Women Asso Tsz Wan Shan Nursery
Our Lady's Kindergarten
PLK Fong Tam Yuen Leung Tsz Wan Shan Kg
Po Leung Kuk Kam Hing Kindergarten
Po Leung Kuk Tsz Lok Kindergarten
Po Leung Kuk Wong Siu Ching Kindergarten
Redemption Lutheran Kindergarten
San Po Kong Rhenish Nursery
Sharon Lutheran Church Kg (Tsz Oi Br)
Shun Sang Anglo-Chinese Kindergarten
Sis. Immaculate Heart of Mary Wts Kg
SKH KLC Or Pui Cheung Kindergarten
Tsung Tsin Mission of HK On Keung N Sch
Tsz Ching Estate Bodhi Siksa Kg
Tsz Wan Shan Kf Welf Assn Rainbow Ac Kg
TWGHs Fong Shiu Yee Nursery Sch
TWGHs Kwan Fong Nursery School
TWGHs Lai Tang Yuen Kaw Kindergarten
Non Joining the Pre-primary Education Voucher Scheme in the 2007/08 School Year
-

Yau Tsim and Mong Kok District
Total schools: 40
Eligible for Redemption of Voucher in the 2007/08 School Year
Cannan Kindergarten (Charming Garden)
CCC Mongkok Church Jeannette Kg
Dominic Savio Kindergarten (Olympic Br)
Gracefield Mongkok Christian Kg
Heep Hong Society Healthy Kids Nur Sch
HK Vern Normal Sch Alumni Assn Sch (Kg)
HKCS Central Nursery School
HKFYG Ching Lok Kindergarten (Yaumatei)
HKSPC Boc Nursery School
HKSPC HK Bank Foundation Nursery School
HKSPC Park’n Shop Staff Charitable Fund Nursery School
HKSPC Portland Street Nursery School
Jordan Pak Hoi Kindergarten
Little Buds Kindergarten
Mong Kok Agnes English Kindergarten
Peniel School and Kindergarten
Po Leung Kuk Tai Kok Tsui Kindergarten
Prosperous Garden Baptist Kindergarten
SA Catherine Booth Nursery Sch
SA Hoi Fu Nursery Sch
SA Lai Chi Kok Nursery Sch
Saint May School
Salvation Army Chan Kwan Tung Kg
Semple Kindergarten
St Gatwick Kindergarten
St Maria Kindergarten
Sun Island English Kindergarten (YMT Br)
Sun Island Kg (Metro Harbour Br)
Tai Tung Sun Chuen St Teresa Kg
Tak Shin Kindergarten and Tutorial Ctr
Tak Sun Private Kindergarten
Wayfoong Nursery School
Western Pacific Kindergarten
Yan Oi Tong West Kowloon Kindergarten
Yaumatei Yang Memorial Methodist Pre-Sch
Non Joining the Pre-primary Education Voucher Scheme in the 2007/08 School Year
Learning Habitat Kg (Hampton Loft)
Parkview International Pre-School (Kln)
Sunnyside Kindergarten
Tsimshatsui Funful International Kg
Young Men's Christian Assn HK Intl Kg

Hong Kong Island

Central and Western District
Total schools: 49
Eligible for Redemption of Voucher in the 2007/08 School Year
Cannan International Kg (Central)
Caritas Ling Yuet Sin Kindergarten
Caritas Nursery School - Kennedy Town
Caritas St Francis Kindergarten
Cherish Eng School & Kindergarten (Local Stream)
Chiu Yang Kindergarten
ELCHK Amazing Grace Nursery School
Hill Road St Albertus Kindergarten
HK True Light Kindergarten (Caine Road)
HKSPC Thomas Tam Nursery School
HKYMCA Tai Hon Fan Nursery School
Kau Yan School (Kg Section)
Ling Yan School
Rhenish Mission School
Sacred Heart Canossian Kg
Sheng Kung Hui Kindergarten
SJS Belcher Kg
St Anthony's A/C Pri Sch & Kg
St Chee Kindergarten
St Clare's Primary School
St Matthew's Church Kindergarten
St Paul's Church Kindergarten
St Stephen's Church Pri Sch & Kg
St Stephen's Girls' College Kg
Sun Island English Kg (Belcher Branch)
Wisdom Castle Kindergarten
Wisely Kindergarten
Women's Welfare Club W-Dist HK Kg
Yan Chai Hospital Fong Kong Fai Kg
Yan Chai Hospital Kwok Chi Leung Kg
Yuk Ying Kindergarten
Non Joining the Pre-primary Education Voucher Scheme in the 2007/08 School Year
Carmel School
Casa Dei Bambini Kindergarten
Cherish Eng School & Kindergarten (International Stream)
Chung Yun School
Discovery Montessori School (Central)(Nursery and Kindergarten)
ESF International Kindergarten
German Swiss International School (Kg)
Highgate House School - The Peak
Ling Yan Nursery
Lycee Francais Int'l (Fre Int'l Sch)(SW)
Mighty Oaks International Nursery and Kindergarten'
Montessori School of Hong Kong
Pre-School Playgroups Asso - City Kidz
Small World Christian Kindergarten
Sunshine House Int'l Pre-Sch (The Peak)
The Harbour School
The Peak Pre-School
Victoria (Belcher) Kindergarten
Wisely Nursery
Woodland Montessori Pre-Sch (Mid Levels)

Hong Kong East District
Total schools: 90
Eligible for Redemption of Voucher in the 2007/08 School Year
Baptist Pui Li School 
Bo Bo Nursery School
Budd TCFS Yeung Tam Yuen Fong Kg
C&M Alliance Scholars' A/C Kg
Cannan Kindergarten (Siu Sai Wan)
Caritas Lions Club HK (Pacific) Nur Sch
CCC Chai Wan Church Dn
Chai Wan K/F Assn Kai Ming Kindergarten
Ching Chung Hing Tung Kindergarten
Creative Kindergarten (Heng Fa Chuen)
Creativity (Park Vale) Kindergarten
CWBC P-S Education Lui Ming Choi Kg (Fei Tsui Road)
CWBC P-S Education Lui Ming Choi Kg (Siu Sai Wan Estate)
Dominic Savio Kindergarten
ELCHK Hing Wah Nursery School
Elite Kindergarten and Education Centre
Epoch A/C Kindergarten
Epworth Village Methodist Church Kg
Gar Lam Anglo-Chinese Kg (Siu Sai Wan)
Garmen Kindergarten School
Garmen Nursery
Good Health A/C Kg (Siu Sai Wan)
Good Health Kindergarten (Siu Sai Wan)
Grace Baptist Kindergarten
Hamilton Hill International Kindergarten
Heng Fa Chuen Lutheran Day Nursery
HK & KKWA Ting Yuk Chee Kindergarten
HK & KKWA Wan Tsui Kindergarten
HKFYG Ching Lok Kindergarten
HKSPC Aw Hoe Nursery School
Hong Kong Man Sang Kg (North Point)
Hop Yat Church Chan Pak Wang Mem Kg
Islamic Abu Bakar Chui Memorial Kg
Kiangsu and Chekiang Primary School
Kornhill Christian A/C Kindergarten
Lutheran Philip Hse Hing Man Nursery Sch
Ming Wai International Kindergarten (Local Stream)
Ming Wai Kindergarten
Ming Wai Kindergarten (North Point Br)
New Jade Elementi Kindergarten
North Point Methodist Church Day Nursery
North Point Methodist Church Kg
Po Leung Kuk Tong Chor Nam Kindergarten
Po Leung Kuk Wai Yin Kg
SA North Point Nursery School
Salem Kindergarten - Shaukiwan
Shau Kei Wan Methodist Kindergarten
Shaukiwan K F W C Centre Eleminti Kg
Shaukiwan Saint Kwong Sch & Ac Kg (Br)
Shaukiwan Tsung Tsin Nursery Sch
SKH Holy Nativity Church Kindergarten
Spring View Kindergarten
St Anna A/C Kindergarten (Local Stream)
St Dominic A/C Kindergarten (Local Stream)
St James Lutheran Kindergarten
St Jude's Catholic Kindergarten
St Monica's A/C Kg (Hing Tung)
St Peter's Church Kindergarten
Star of The Sea Catholic Kindergarten
The Baptist Convention of HK Yiu Hing Kg
The Endeavourers Chan Cheng Kit Wan Kindergarten
The HK Chinese Women's Club Kg Nursery School
TWGHs Chiap Hua Cheng's Nursery School
TWGHs Fong Shu Chuen Nursery School
TWGHs Fong Shu Fook Tong Kindergarten
WWC (Eastern Dist) Nursery HK
WWC (Ed) HK Lai Kwai Tim Day Nursery
WWCWDHK David Woo Mem Kg
Yiu Tung Baptist Kindergarten
Zion Lutheran Kindergarten
Non Joining the Pre-primary Education Voucher Scheme in the 2007/08 School Year
Braemar Hill Nursery School
Causeway Bay Victoria Intl Kindergarten
Causeway Bay Victoria Kindergarten
Causeway Bay Victoria Nursery
Chinese International School (Kg Sect)
Darling Babe Pre-School
Darling Child International Pre-School
Kiangsu&Chekiang Pri Sch (Int’l Sect Kg)
Korean International School (Kg Section)
Kornhill A/C Kindergarten
Kornhill Victoria Kindergarten
Ming Wai International Kg (North Point)
Ming Wai International Kindergarten (International Stream)
North Point Kindergarten of Oisca
St Anna A/C Kindergarten (International Stream)
St Dominic A/C Kindergarten (International Stream)
Tanpopo Kindergarten
Wembley International Kindergarten

Islands District
Total schools: 31
Eligible for Redemption of Voucher in the 2007/08 School Year
Buddhist Cheung Mui Kwai Kindergarten
Buddhist Chun Yue Kg (Tung Chung)
CCC Cheung Chau Church Kam Kong Kg
Chan En Mei Lutheran Day Nursery
Cheung Chau Sacred Heart Kindergarten
Chr The Faith Hope Love Ch Yat Tung Kg
Christ & Missionary Alliance Tai O Kg
Cumberland Presbyterian Ch Green Pasture
Dynamic Kids Kindergarten
Hamilton Hill International Kindergarten
HKSKH Tung Chung Nursery School
Ho Yu Kg (Sponsored by Sik Sik Yuen)
Kind Hing Trinity International Kindergarten
Lick Hang Kindergarten
Lui Kwan Pok Lutheran Day Nursery
Mui Woh Church Kindergarten
NAAC Tung Chung Day Nursery
Nam Ying Kindergarten
Our Lady of Lourdes Catholic Kg
PLK Cheung Poon Mei Yee Kindergarten
Shin Yat Tong Yat Tung Kindergarten
Sun Island Kindergarten (Tung Chung Br)
Train's Anglo-Chinese Kindergarten
Tung Chung Baptist Kindergarten
Tung Chung Catholic Kindergarten
Wai Peng Kindergarten School
Non Joining the Pre-primary Education Voucher Scheme in the 2007/08 School Year
Discovery Montessori School (Nursery and Kindergarten)
Discovery Bay International Sch
Discovery Mind Kindergarten
Discovery Mind Kindergarten (Branch)
Greenfield Eng (Intl) Kg (Tung Chung)
Leafy International Kindergarten
Sunshine House Intl Pre-Sch (Tung Chung)
Sunshine House Kindergarten

Southern District
Total schools: 40
Eligible for Redemption of Voucher in the 2007/08 School Year
Aberdeen Baptist Church Pak Kwong Kg
C & Ma Lei Tung Nursery Sch
C & Ma South Horizons Nur Sch
Cannan International Kindergarten (HK)
Creative Kindergarten (Sham Wan Towers)
EtonHouse International Kindergarten (Tai Tam)
Harvest Kindergarten
Ho Yan Kg (Spon by Sik Sik Yuen)
Lei Tung Lutheran Day Nursery
PLK Mrs Vicwood K T Chong (Wah Kwai) Kg
SA Wah Fu Nursery Sch
St Monica's A/C Kg (Wah Kwai Est)
St Monica's Anglo-Chinese Kindergarten
St Peter's Catholic Kindergarten
St Peter's Church Kindergarten (Stanley)
The HKHMC Yan Oi Kindergarten
Tin Wan Methodist Kindergarten
TWGHs Shiu Wong Lee Moon Fook N Sch
TWGHs Tin Wan Kindergarten
Wah Kwai Estate Anglo-Chinese Kg
WWCWDHK Ap Lei Chau Kg
Non Joining the Pre-primary Education Voucher Scheme in the 2007/08 School Year
Canadian International School
Good Health A/C Kg (Ap Lei Chau)
Kellett School
Montessori For Children (Nursery)
Panda Pre-School
Parkview International Pre-School
Repulse Bay Pre-School
Rightmind Kindergarten (Chi Fu Fa Yuen)
Rightmind Kindergarten (South Horizons)
Singapore International Sch (HK)
Southside Kindergarten (southside.edu.hk)
St Teresa's Kindergarten
Sunshine House International Pre-School
Sunshine House Int'l Pre-School (Chi Fu)
The Woodland Pre-School (Pokfulam)
Tutor Time International Kindergarten
Victoria (South Horizons) Intl Kg
Woodland Mont Pre-Sch 109 Repulse Bay Rd
Woodland Montessori Pre-Sch Repulse Bay
Woodland Montessori Pre-School (Tai Tam)

Wan Chai District
Total schools: 34
Eligible for Redemption of Voucher in the 2007/08 School Year
Angel Kindergarten & Tutorial Centre
BGCAHK Cheerland Kindergarten (Wanchai)
HKCS Times Nursery School
Hong Kong Ling Liang Church Kindergarten
Lingnan Day Nursery
Lingnan Primary School & Kindergarten
Muslim Community Kindergarten
OKRBC Lui Kwok Pat Fong Kindergarten
PLK Vicwood Chong Kee Ting Kindergarten
Po Leung Kuk Kindergarten
Precious Blood Kindergarten
Rosaryhill School (Kindergarten Section)
Sheng Kung Hui Kg (Mount Butler)
SJS Causeway Bay Kg
SJS Kathleen Mcdouall Kg
SKH St Christopher's Nursery (Wan Chai)
Southside.edu.hk
St Margaret Mary's Catholic Kindergarten
St Paul's Kindergarten
The Church of Christ In China Wanchai Church Kindergarten / Nursery
True Light Middle Sch of HK K/G
TWGHs Ng Sheung Lan Memorial Nur Sch
Non Joining the Pre-primary Education Voucher Scheme in the 2007/08 School Year
Alison's Letterland International Kg
Bambino English Playschool
Hong Kong Academy Primary Sch
International Montessori Sch - An IMEF
Khalsa Diwan Kindergarten
Lycee Francais Intl (Fren Intl Sch)
St Joseph's College Kindergarten
St Paul's Day Nursery
Starters School
Teikyo Hong Kong Kindergarten
The Woodland Int'l School
Tinkerbell Kindergarten
Woodland Pre-School (Happy Valley)

New Territories West

Kwai Chung and Tsing Yi District
Total schools: 71
Eligible for Redemption of Voucher in the 2007/08 School Year
Anani Kindergarten
AOG Wa Wai Kindergarten (Cheung Hong)
Asbury Methodist Kindergarten
CCC Chuen Yuen Kindergarten
Cheung Ching Lutheran Day Nursery
Chinese YMCA Kwai Chung Kindergarten
Cho Yiu Chuen Methodist Kindergarten
Choice Eng School & Kindergarten (TY Br)
Creative Kindergarten (Tsing Yi)
Creative Kindergarten (Wonderland Villas)
ELCHK Grace Nursery School
ELCHK Ling Kung Nursery School
Fu Yiu Kindergarten
Good Health A/C Kindergarten (Tsing Yi)
Greenville A/C Kindergarten
HKSKH Lady Maclehose Ctr (Shek Yam) Kg
HKSKH Lady Maclehose Ctr Kg
HKSKH St Nicholas' Nursery School
HKYMCA Cheung Ching Nursery School
Islamic Pok Oi Kindergarten
Kwai Chung Baptist Church Kindergarten
Kwai Chung St Peter Kindergarten
Kwai Shing Rhenish Church Kindergarten
Lai King Kingsland Kindergarten
Lai King Rhenish Nursery
Lok King Kindergarten
Maritime Square Lutheran Day Nursery
NT Tin Sum A/C Kindergarten
NTW&JWA Cheung Fat Est Children Garden
Peace Evangelical Centre Kg (Tsing Yi)
Po Leung Kuk Kwai Fong Kindergarten
Po Leung Kuk Kwai Shing Kindergarten
Po Leung Kuk Mrs Chao King Lin Kg
Po Leung Kuk Mrs Tam Wah Ching Kg
Po Leung Kuk Tin Ka Ping Kindergarten
Po Leung Kuk Ting Mau Kindergarten
Rock of Ages Lutheran Kindergarten
SA Tai Wo Hau Nursery Sch
SKH Crown of Thorns Church Kwai Chung Kg
SKH Crown of Thorns Church Sadick Kg
SKH Crown of Thorns Church Tsing Yi Kg
SKH St Christopher's Nur (Kwai Chung)
St Stephen's Catholic Kindergarten
St Thomas' Catholic Kindergarten
Sun Island Eng Kg (Kwai King Br)
Sun Island English Kg (Kwai Chung Br)
Sun Island English Kg (Kwai Hing Branch)
Sung Kei Kindergarten
The Salvation Army Fu Keung Kindergarten
Tivoli Anglo Chinese Kindergarten (Local Stream)
Tivoli Kindergarten (Local Stream)
Tsing Yi Rural Committee Kindergarten
Tsing Yi Trade Assn Kindergarten
Tsing Yi Trade Association Shek Yam Kg
Tsuen Wan Baptist Church Shek Lei Kg
Tsuen Wan Trade Assn Chu Cheong Kg
Tsuen Wan Trade Assn Yau Kin Fung Kg
Tw Trade Assn Chung Loi Kindergarten
TWGHs Lions Club The Peak HK Nur Sch
TWGHs Wong Wu Lai Ming Kindergarten
W F B Manjusri Nursery Sch
Yan Chai Hospital Ju Ching Chu Kg
Yan Chai Hospital Tung Pak Ying Kg
Yan Oi Tong Pang Hung Cheung Kg
Ych Zonta Club of Kowloon Kindergarten
Non Joining the Pre-primary Education Voucher Scheme in the 2007/08 School Year
ESF International Kg (Tsing Yi)
Learning Habitat Kindergarten
Rhoda International Kindergarten
Think International Kg (Mei Foo)
Tivoli Anglo Chinese Kindergarten (International Stream)
Tivoli Kindergarten (International Stream)

Tsuen Wan District
Total schools: 38
Eligible for Redemption of Voucher in the 2007/08 School Year
AL & VS Education Fund Gordon Pei Kg
Allway Kindergarten
Annunciation Catholic Kindergarten
AOG Mcleod Memorial Kg
Blessing Kindergarten (Belvedere)
Cannan International Kg (Riviera Garden)
Cannan Kindergarten (Tsuen Wan)
Castar Kindergarten (Lei Muk Shue)
CCC HK Council Fuk Yau Kg
CCC HK Council Fuk Yau No Ii Kg
Chuen Yuen Church Kindergarten
Creative Kindergarten (Ma Wan)
Fok Loy Estate Kam Chuen Kindergarten
HK Taoist Assn Yuen Yuen Kindergarten
HKSPC Sham Tseng Nursery School
HKYMCA Tsuen Wan Nursery School
Moon Lok Kindergarten
Morning Sun Kindergarten
Parkview-Rhine Garden Pre-School (Local Stream)
Po Leung Kuk Fong Tam Yuen Leung Kg
Po Leung Kuk Lei Muk Shue Kindergarten
SA Lei Muk Shue Nursery Sch
SA Ng Kwok Wai Memorial Kindergarten
SA Tsuen Wan Nursery Sch
St Monica's Anglo-Chinese Kg (Tsuen Wan)
St Monica's Kindergarten (Tsuen Wan)
Tsuen Wan Baptist Church Kindergarten
Tsuen Wan Our Lady Kindergarten
Tsuen Wan St Andrew Anglo-Chinese Kg
Tsuen Wan St Dominic Savio Kindergarten
Tsuen Wan Wisdom (Anglo-Chinese) Kg
Wisdom Kindergarten
Yan Chai Hospital Choi Pat Tai Kg
Non Joining the Pre-primary Education Voucher Scheme in the 2012/13 School Year
Swindon Kindergarten
Discovery Funful Kindergarten
Luk Yeung Kindergarten
Tsuen Wan Wisdom (Anglo-Chinese) Kindergarten
Wisdom Kindergarten
Riviera Funful Kindergarten

Tuen Mun District
Total schools: 66
Eligible for Redemption of Voucher in the 2007/08 School Year
AEFCHK-EFCC- So Sum Memorial Nursery Sch
Agnes English Kindergarten
Baptist Convention of HK Po Tin Kg
But San Kindergarten
CCC Tuen Mun Kg
Ching Chung Wu King Kindergarten
Creative Kindergarten (Aegean Coast)
Creative Kindergarten (Tuen Mun Branch)
Creativity (Tai Lam) Kindergarten
Fu Tai Lutheran Day Nursery
Glorious Garden St Teresa Kindergarten
Guideposts Kg (Tuen Mun Br)
Guideposts Kg 2nd Br (Kin Sang Estate)
HKSKH St Simon's Leung King Nursery Sch
HKSKH St Simon's Tai Hing Nursery Sch
HKSPC Butterfly Estate Nursery School
HKYMCA On Ting Nursery School
Hoh Fuk Tong Kg (TM Ch CCC HK CCL)
Jing Jing Kg (Brilliant Garden)
Jing Jing Kg (Tuen Mun Branch)
Karlam Anglo-Chinese Kg (Oasis Garden)
Karlam Kindergarten (Tuen Mun Branch)
Kin Sang Baptist Church Bradbury Pre Sch
Kin Sang Lutheran Kindergarten
Leung King Lutheran Day Nursery
LKWFS Chu Sui Lan Anglo-Chinese Kg
Lok Sin Tong Tang Tak Lim Kindergarten
Lotus Assn HK Siu Hei Court Kindergarten
LST Cheung Yip Mou Ching Kindergarten
Lui Cheung Kwong Lutheran Kindergarten
Melody A/C Kg (Prime View Garden Br)
Melody Anglo-Chinese Kindergarten
Melody Nursery (Melody Garden)
N.T. Assemblies of God Church Wai Man Kg
New Generation English Kindergarten (Tm)
PLK Tin Ka Ping Siu Hong Kindergarten
Po Leung Kuk Butterfly Bay Kindergarten
Po Leung Kuk Choi Koon Shum Kindergarten
Po Leung Kuk Yau Oi Kindergarten
Po Leung Kuk Yick Kwai Fong Kindergarten
Regina Coeli A/C Kg (Second Branch)
Regina Coeli A/C Kindergarten
SA Sam Shing Nursery Sch
Shan King Estate Baptist Kindergarten
SKH S P Ch Castle Peak Tsing Wun Rd Kg
SKH St Peter's Church Cp Siu Lun Crt Kg
SKH St Peter's Church Kg (Castle Peak)
SKH St Peter's Church Shan King Est Kg
St Simon's Leung King Kindergarten
STFA Tm Leung Lee Sau Yu Kindergarten
TKED Lui Kwok Pat Fong Kindergarten
Truth Baptist Church Empower Kg
TWGHs Fong Tam Yuen Leung Nursery Sch
TWGHs Ko Teck Kin Memorial Kindergarten
TWGHs Lee Wong Hing Cheung Memorial Kindergarten
TWGHs Tin Ka Ping Nursery Sch
W F B Avalokitesvara Nursery Sch
W F B Mantra Institute Nursery Sch
Yan Chai Hospital Shan King Kindergarten
Yan Chai Hospital Yau Oi Kindergarten
Yan Chai Hospital Yim Tsui Yuk Shan Kg
Yan Oi Tong Allan Yap Kindergarten
Yan Oi Tong Lau Wong Fat Kindergarten
Yan Oi Tong Ngan Po Ling Kindergarten
Yan Oi Tong Tin Ka Ping Kg
Non Joining the Pre-primary Education Voucher Scheme in the 2007/08 School Year
Jing Jing Kg Brilliant Garden Branch No2

Yuen Long District
Total schools: 81
Eligible for Redemption of Voucher in the 2007/08 School Year
Academy Kindergarten (Tin Shui Wai)
AEFCHK EFCC Tin Yan Nursery School
Agnes Kindergarten (Grandeur Terrace)
AOG Paul Church Kg (Tin Wah Estate)
Buddhist Chi Kwong Kindergarten
C & Ma Tin Chung Nursery Sch
C&M Alliance Fairview Park Kindergarten
Castar Kindergarten
Ceces Organized Aetna Preschool
Chinese YMCA Kindergarten
Christian Alliance Chen Lee W T Mem Kg
Creative Kindergarten (Yuen Long)
CUHK FAA Chan Chun Ha Kindergarten
First Assembly of God Church Tin Chak Nursery
Gigamind Kindergarten
Guideposts Kg 3rd Br (Tin Shui Estate)
HHCKLA Buddhist Lam Wong Ming Wai Kg
HKCS Tin Heng Nursery School
HKSKH Ha Sui Wan Nursery School
HKSPC Wai Yin Club Nursery School
Ho Shui Kg (Spon by Sik Sik Yuen)
Jade Kindergarten
Jing Jing A/C Kg (Hung Shui Kiu Br)
Joseph Kindergarten
Kam Tin Dragon Kindergarten
Karlam A/C Kindergarten
Long Ping Estate Sing Yan Kindergarten
NAAC Yuen Long Day Nursery
Nt Assemblies of God Church Wai Yan Kg
NTW&JWA Yuen Long Children Garden
Po Leung Kuk Chan Seng Yee Kg
Po Leung Kuk Yuen Long Kindergarten
Poh Chan Poon Pui Ching Memorial Kg
Poh Mrs Chu Kwok King Memorial Kg
Pristine Kindergarten
Queen Elizabeth Sch Old Students'Assn Kg
Regent's Kindergarten (Branch School)
SA Kam Tin Nursery Sch
Sagarmatha Kindergarten
SKH St Joseph's Church Kindergarten
SKH St Matthias' Church Chiu Chun Kindergarten
SKH St Matthias' Church Nursery School
St Jerome's Catholic Kindergarten
St Lorraine English Kindergarten (Local Stream)
St Lorraine Kindergarten (Yuen Long) (Local Stream)
Sun Island English Kg (Yuen Long Branch)
Tai Kong Po Kindergarten 1St Branch
Tai Kong Po Nursery
Tai Po Baptist Kg Tin Chak Estate Branch
Talent Kindergarten
Tammy Kindergarten
Tammy Nursery
The MCC Little Angel (Tin Shing) Kg
Tin Shui Wai Alliance Kindergarten
Tin Yiu Estate Ho Kwang Hung Kg
Topkids Anglo-Chinese Kindergarten
Tsing Yi Trade Asso Tin Shui Wai Kg
TWGHs Wong Chu Wai Fun Kindergarten
TWGHs Zonta Club of Kowloon Nursery Sch
Wing Jan School
Yan Chai Hospital Ming Tak Kindergarten
Yan Chai Hospital Nina Lam Kindergarten
Yan Oi Tong Tin Yiu Kindergarten
Yl Church (CCC) Chan Kwong Kg
Yl Tk Dist Assn Mrs Wong Siu Keung Kg
Yl Tung Koon Dist Assn Hung Ting Ka Kg
YLC (CCC) Chow Sung Chu Oi Nursery Sch
YLC (CCC) Ltd Long Ping Est Chan Kwong Kg
Ylpmsaa Lau Leung Sheung Mem Kg
Yuen Kong Kindergarten
Yuen Long Church (CCC) Ltd Chan Kwong Kg
Yuen Long Lutheran Life Kindergarten
Yuen Long Merchants Association Kg
Yuen Long Rhenish Nursery
Yuen Long Sam Yuk Kindergarten
Yuen Yuen Kindergarten (Tin Yat Estate)
Zenith Anglo-Chinese Kindergarten
Zenith Kg (Yuen Long)
Non Joining the Pre-primary Education Voucher Scheme in the 2007/08 School Year
St Lorraine English Kindergarten (International Stream)
St Lorraine Kindergarten (Yuen Long) (International Stream)
Topkids International Pre-School

New Territories East

North District
Total schools: 41
Eligible for Redemption of Voucher in the 2007/08 School Year
Bilok Anglo-Chinese Kindergarten
Buddhist Sum Tung Fook Kindergarten
Cannan Eng & Chinese Kg (Sha Tau Kok)
Carbo Anglo-Chinese Kg (Fanling)
Caritas Nursery School - Ta Kwu Ling
Caritas Zonta Club of HK Nursery Sch
Catiline A/C Kindergarten (Avon)
Chi Chr Wk's Fellowship Ltd Choi Po Kg
Chi Chr Wk's Fellowsp Ltd King Shing Kg
Chr The Faith Hope Love Ch Wah Ming Kg
Dawning Views Elementi English Kg
Evangelical Lu Ch of HK Cheung Wah Kg
Fanling AOG Church Grace Light Kg
Fanling Baptist Church Lui Ming Choi Kg
Fung Kai Kindergarten
Good Time Play Sch (Fanling Ctr) (Local Stream)
Greenfield Kg (Sheung Shui Centre)
HHCKLA Buddhist Wai Kwong Kindergarten
HKEC Elite Kindergarten
HKSPC Operation Santa Claus Fanling N S
Hong Kong 5-S Kindergarten
Ka Fuk Baptist Church Pre-School
Kam Tsin Village Ho Tung Kindergarten
Kln City Baptist Church Ka Fuk Kg
NAAC Fanling Day Nursery
NTW&JWA Fanling Children Garden
NTW&JWA Sheung Shui Children Garden
PLK Mrs Vicwood K T Chong Kindergarten
PLK Tai So Shiu Wan Kg
SA Tin Ping Nursery Sch
Sheung Shui Church Kindergarten
Sheung Shui Pui Yau Kindergarten
Sheung Shui Rhenish Church Kindergarten
Sheung Shui Wai Chow Kindergarten (Br)
Tai Ping Kindergarten
The Fanling Assemblies of God Kindergarten
Truth Baptist Church Ho Yuen Wai King Kg
TWGHs Hung Wong Kar Gee Nursery Sch
TWGHs Tsui Tsin Tong Kindergarten
Yan Chai Hospital Wing Lung Kindergarten
Non Joining the Pre-primary Education Voucher Scheme in the 2007/08 School Year
Good Time Play Sch (Fanling Ctr) (International Stream)

Sha Tin District
Total schools: 75
Eligible for Redemption of Voucher in the 2007/08 School Year
AL & VS Education Fund Delia Pei Kg
AOG Wa Wai Church Hin Keng A/C Kg
Assembly of God Union Church Kg
Baptist Convention of HK Lee On Nursery
Benevolent Light Kindergarten
C & M A Joyful Peace Kindergarten
C & Ma Shatin Nursery Sch
Caritas Nursery School - Shatin
Catiline Anglo-Chinese Kindergarten
CCC Shatin Church Pok Hong Kindergarten
Christian Little Angel Kg (Kam Fung Ct)
Creative Kindergarten (Castello)
CUHKFAA Thomas Cheung Kindergarten
DMAHK Mong Yang Hsueh Chi Kindergarten
ELCHK Chung On Nursery School
ELCHK Shatin Lutheran Kindergarten
Emmanuel Church Shatin Nursery School
Fm Church Bradbury Chun Lei Nursery Sch
Good Health A/C Kindergarten (Ma On Shan)
Good Health Kindergarten (Ma On Shan)
Good Time Play Sch (Shatin Plaza) (Local Stream)
Heng On Baptist Nursery School
HK & KKWA Ting Sun Hui Chiu Kindergarten
HK & Kln K/F W A Sun Fong Chung Kg
HK&KKWA Sun Fong Chung Kg (Sui Wo Court)
HKSPC The Jockey Club Hok Sam Nursery Sch
HKYMCA Lung Hang Nursery School
Holford Anglo-Chinese Kindergarten
Hop Yat Church Shin Ka Chuen Memorial Kg
Immaculate Heart of Mary Kindergarten
Jingle Bell Kindergarten
Kln City Baptist Church Hay Nien Kg
Kwong Lam Baptist Lui Kwok Pat Fong Kg
Lok Sin Tong Stephen Leung Kindergarten
Loving Heart Lutheran Kindergarten
Lutheran Philip Hse Oi Lun Nursery Sch
Ma On Shan Ling Liang Kindergarten
Mei Lam Estate To Kwong Kindergarten
New Kln Women Asso Sha Kok Nursery
New Kln Women Asso Sun Chui Nursery
NTW&JWA Pok Hong Estate Children Garden
Peace Evangelical Centre Kindergarten
PLK Fung Leung Kit Memorial Kindergarten
Po Leung Kuk Lek Yuen Kindergarten
Po Leung Kuk Ng Tor Tai Kindergarten
SA Jat Min Nursery Sch
SA Wo Che Nursery Sch
Salvation Army Tin Ka Ping Kindergarten
Sha Kok Estate Wai Yan Kindergarten
SKH Holy Spirit Church Wo Che Kg
Stewards Pooi Chun Kindergarten
STFA Leung Lee Sau Yu (St) Kindergarten
Sun Island English Kg (Shatin Park Br)
Sun Island Kg (Shatin Park Branch)
Truth Baptist Church Glory Nursery
Truth Baptist Church Grace Kindergarten
Truth Baptist Church Kindergarten
Truth Baptist Church Pictorial Kindergarten
Tsung Tsin Miss Graceful Kg (Ma On Shan)
TWGHs Chan King Har Kindergarten
TWGHs Lions Club South Kln Nursery Sch
TWGHs Liu Yan Tak Memorial Kindergarten
TWGHs Lui Fung Faung Memorial Kg
Wellborn A/C Kindergarten
Yiu Wing A/C Kindergarten
Yue Tin Court Yiu Wing A/C Kindergarten
Non Joining the Pre-primary Education Voucher Scheme in the 2007/08 School Year
Box Hill (HK) International Kindergarten
Catiline Kindergarten
David (Exodus) Kindergarten
Good Time Play Sch (Shatin Plaza) (International Stream)
Greenfield English Kg (Ma On Shan)
Hong Kong (Ascot) Preschool
International Christ Sch - Element & Kg
Think International Kg (Ma On Shan)
Wellborn International Pre-School

Tai Po District
Total schools: 33
Eligible for Redemption of Voucher in the 2007/08 School Year
AEFCHK - EFCC - Po Nga Nursery School
Bowie Anglo-Chinese Kindergarten
C & Ma Plover Cove Nursery Sch
Christ & Miss Alli Tai Wo Kindergarten
Fu Heng Baptist Lui Kwok Pat Fong Kg
HK Taoist Assn Yuen Yuen Kg (Fu Shin Est)
HKSPC Lam Woo Nursery School
Lee Andrew Memorial A/C Kindergarten
Mink A/C Kindergarten
Pentecostal Church of HK Tai Wo Ns
PLK Tang Bik Wan Memorial Kindergarten
Po Leung Kuk Kwong Fuk Kindergarten
SA Tai Yuen Nursery Sch
SKH the Church of Our Saviour Kg
St Paul's Catholic Day Nursery
Tai Po Baptist Kg Wan Tau Tong Est Br
Tai Po Baptist Kindergarten
Tai Po Catholic Kindergarten
Tai Po Merchants Assn Kindergarten
Tai Po Methodist Kindergarten
Tai Po Rhenish Church Kindergarten
Tai Po Rhenish Church Kindergarten
The HKIED HSBC ECLC (Kg Section)
Tsung Tsin Mission of HK On Yan Kg
TWGHs Fong Lai Ming Nursery School
TWGHs Hung Wong Kar Gee Kg
Yan Oi Tong Mrs Augusta Cheung Kg
Zenith Kindergarten (Tai Po)
Non Joining the Pre-primary Education Voucher Scheme in the 2007/08 School Year
Anchors International Nursery
Anchors Kindergarten
Mink International Pre-School
Norwegian International School
Orchard Kindergarten
Zebedee International Kindergarten

Footnotes

See also

Education in Hong Kong
List of schools in Hong Kong
List of primary schools in Hong Kong
List of secondary schools in Hong Kong
Higher education in Hong Kong
List of universities in Hong Kong
List of special schools in Hong Kong
List of international schools in Hong Kong
List of English Schools Foundation schools

References

Profile of Kindergartens and Kindergarten-cum-Child Care Centres, http://chsc.edb.hkedcity.net/kindergarten/?lang=e, assessed on 12 November 2007

External links
Profile of Kindergartens and Kindergarten-cum-Child Care Centres

Kindergartens
Schools
Early childhood education in Hong Kong